Anomala flavipennis, the panhandle beach anomala scarab beetle, is a species of shining leaf chafer in the family Scarabaeidae.

Subspecies
These seven subspecies belong to the species Anomala flavipennis:
 Anomala flavipennis amissa Casey, 1915 c g
 Anomala flavipennis aransas Potts, 1977 i g
 Anomala flavipennis flavipennis Burmeister, 1844 i g
 Anomala flavipennis luteipennis LeConte, 1854 c g
 Anomala flavipennis modulata Casey, 1915 c g
 Anomala flavipennis okaloosensis Potts, 1977 i g b (anomala flavipennis flavipennis)
 Anomala flavipennis subquadrata Casey, 1915 i g
Data sources: i = ITIS, c = Catalogue of Life, g = GBIF, b = Bugguide.net

References

Further reading

 

Rutelinae
Articles created by Qbugbot
Beetles described in 1844